Caux may refer to:

Places 
 Caux, Hérault, southern France
 Caux, Switzerland
 Pays de Caux, Normandy
 Caux or Kaw, French Guiana
 Caus Castle, near Westbury, Shropshire

People 
 Caux (surname)